Club de Regatas Vasco da Gama Beach Soccer is a Brazilian men's professional beach soccer team based in Rio de Janeiro, Brazil. It is a part of the multi-sports club Club de Regatas Vasco da Gama. Vasco da Gama Beach Soccer was found in 1999.

History

O C.R. Vasco da Gama Beach Soccer won the first Mundialito de Clubes in 2011 hosted in São Paulo, Brazil.

Mundialito de Clubes 2015 squad

Coach: Fábio Costa	

 Source:

Honours

  Although it has qualified for the competition from the Brazilian Championship of 2017, the club is considered champions of the Copa Libertadores of 2016. Both competitions were destined to be disputed in December 2016, nevertheless, due to the tragedy with the team of the Chapecoense, were postponed to the beginning of 2017. For reasons of homologation with the CONMEBOL, the edition of the Copa Libertadores continued being referring to the year 2016, while the Confederação Brasileira de Futebol opted to leave the edition of the Brazilian Championship referring to the year of dispute, in this case 2017.

Noted players

 Benjamin
 Betinho
 Bokinha
 Bruno Xavier
 Bueno
 Buru
 Catarino
 Cesinha
 Edmundo
 Jorginho
 Júnior Negão
 Lucão
 Mauricinho
 Rafael Padilha
 Pampero
 Villalobos
 Salgueiro

References

Beach soccer in Brazil
Beach soccer